Catherine Bellis was the defending champion but chose not to participate.

Madison Brengle won the title, defeating Zarina Diyas in the final, 6–4, 4–6, 6–4.

Seeds

Draw

Finals

Top half

Bottom half

References

Main Draw

Mercer Tennis Classic - Singles